Carinoclymenia was a genus of ammonites that existed during the Devonian.

References

Devonian ammonites
Late Devonian first appearances
Late Devonian animals
Cyrtoclymeniina
Ammonite genera